John Turano, also known as Based Spartan, has been described as a former "icon of the alt-right 'Patriot' movement.

Personal life
Turano lives in Los Angeles, as of 2018.

References

Living people
People from Los Angeles
Year of birth missing (living people)